Pediococcus cellicola is a species of Gram-positive bacteria. Strains of this species were originally isolated from a fermenting cellar in Hebei Province, China.

References

External links
Type strain of Pediococcus cellicola at BacDive -  the Bacterial Diversity Metadatabase

Lactobacillaceae
Bacteria described in 2005